Ker-Feal, built in 1775, is an historic fieldstone dwelling located in West Pikeland Township, Chester County, Pennsylvania. It was listed on the National Register of Historic Places on November 7, 2003.

The property was purchased by Albert C. Barnes and his wife Laura in 1940 and expanded with two additions. The name "Ker-Feal" means "Fidèle's House" in Breton and was named after Barnes' favorite dog, Fidèle  de Port Manech. The property is now owned by the Barnes Foundation. Ker-Feal received an upgraded climate-control system in 2001 paid for with several grants. Another grant in 2006 allowed for grounds assessment.

See also
National Register of Historic Places listings in Northern Chester County, Pennsylvania

References

External links
32 photographs at the Library of Congress

Houses on the National Register of Historic Places in Pennsylvania
Houses in Chester County, Pennsylvania
Houses completed in 1775
National Register of Historic Places in Chester County, Pennsylvania